Yankwashi is a local government area of Jigawa State in Nigeria. The local government headquarters is at Karkarna.
 

The postal code of Yankwashi is 705102.

Towns and villages in Yankwashi

 Achilafia 
 Ba Auzini
 Badaza
 Belas
 Daba
 Dan Dutse
 Dandi
 Souradeep
 Gwarta
 Kafin Chiroma
 Karkarna
 Kwarin Kalgo
 Rauda
 Ringim
 Tsedau
 Yankwashi
 Zungumba

References

Local Government Areas in Jigawa State